Darwen is a market town and civil parish in Lancashire, England.

Darwen may also refer to:
River Darwen, a river that runs through Darwen and Blackburn in Lancashire, England
Darwen (UK Parliament constituency) was a county constituency in Lancashire, centred on the town of Darwen, England
Darwen Group was a bus manufacturer located in Blackburn, Lancashire, England

Football clubs
A.F.C. Darwen, a football club from Darwen, Lancashire, England
Darwen F.C. was a football club from Darwen, Lancashire, England

People with the surname Darwen

Hugh Darwen (born 1943), British computer scientist 
Wayne Darwen, Australian journalist and television producer

See also
Darwin (disambiguation)